Fluxinella gelida is a species of extremely small deep water sea snail, a marine gastropod mollusk in the family Seguenziidae.

Distribution
This marine species occurs in the South African part of the South Atlantic Ocean.

References

External links
 To Encyclopedia of Life
 To World Register of Marine Species
 Barnard K.H. (1963). Deep sea Mollusca from west of Cape Point, South Africa. Annals of the South African Museum. 46(17): 407-452
  Herbert D.G. (2015). An annotated catalogue and bibliography of the taxonomy, synonymy and distribution of the Recent Vetigastropoda of South Africa (Mollusca). Zootaxa. 4049(1): 1-98

gelida
Gastropods described in 1963